Commophila is a genus of moths belonging to the family Tortricidae.

Species
Commophila aeneana (Hubner, [1799-1800])
Commophila nevadensis Traugott-Olsen, 1990

See also
List of Tortricidae genera

References

 , 2005: World catalogue of insects volume 5 Tortricidae.
 , [1825] 1816, Verz. bekannter Schmett.: 392
 , 2011: Diagnoses and remarks on genera of Tortricidae, 2: Cochylini (Lepidoptera: Tortricidae). Shilap Revista de Lepidopterologia 39 (156): 397–414.

External links
tortricidae.com

Cochylini
Tortricidae genera